James Alexander Drake Jr. (April 6, 1932 – January 10, 2022) was an American photographer, known for his work for the sports magazine Sports Illustrated. Drake died from lung cancer at his home in Philadelphia, Pennsylvania, on January 10, 2022, at the age of 89.

References 

1932 births
2022 deaths
20th-century American photographers
Photographers from Philadelphia
Sports Illustrated photojournalists
Deaths from lung cancer in Pennsylvania